Protobathra is a moth genus in the subfamily Autostichinae.

Species
 Protobathra binotata Bradley, 1961
 Protobathra erista Meyrick, 1916
 Protobathra coenotypa (Meyrick, 1918)

Former species
 Protobathra leucostola Meyrick, 1921

References

Autostichinae